Unión Deportiva Orotava is a Spanish football team based in La Orotava, Tenerife, in the Canary Islands. Founded on 9 March 1923, it currently plays in Interinsular Preferente – Group 2, and holds home games at Estadio Municipal Los Cuartos, with a 6,500 capacity.

History
Founded on 9 March 1923 under the name of Orotava Football Club, the club merged with Club de Fútbol Victoria, Club Deportivo Orotava and Club de Fútbol San Pablo, another clubs from the city, in 1944. After the merger, the club adopted the name of Unión Deportiva Orotava, but played for a few seasons in the 1940s under the name of Atlético Orotava.

After several years in the regional leagues, Orotava achieved their first-ever promotion to the Tercera División in 1980. They remained in the category for 21 consecutive seasons, winning their group in the 1993–94 season but missing out promotion in the play-offs.

Orotava suffered relegation to the Interinsular Preferente in 2001, and continued to appear mainly in the category in the following years.

Season to season

21 seasons in Tercera División

References

External links
 
Fútbol Regional team profile 

Football clubs in the Canary Islands
Sport in Tenerife
Association football clubs established in 1923
1923 establishments in Spain